Jungermannia is a genus of leafy liverworts belonging to the family Jungermanniaceae. They have a worldwide distribution.

Species
As accepted by World Flora Online;

 Jungermannia achroa 
 Jungermannia acris 
 Jungermannia aculeata 
 Jungermannia adscendens 
 Jungermannia aequiloba 
 Jungermannia affinis 
 Jungermannia albicans 
 Jungermannia algeriensis 
 Jungermannia alicularia 
 Jungermannia allenii 
 Jungermannia alternifolia 
 Jungermannia amakawana 
 Jungermannia amentacea 
 Jungermannia amoena 
 Jungermannia amplexicaulis 
 Jungermannia amplexifolia 
 Jungermannia anisodonta 
 Jungermannia antarctica 
 Jungermannia appressifolia 
 Jungermannia aquatica 
 Jungermannia arenaria 
 Jungermannia ariadne 
 Jungermannia ascendens 
 Jungermannia asplenioides 
 Jungermannia atro-olivacea 
 Jungermannia atrobrunnea 
 Jungermannia atrofusca 
 Jungermannia atrovirens 
 Jungermannia aubertii 
 Jungermannia austroafricana 
 Jungermannia balfourii 
 Jungermannia bantamensis 
 Jungermannia bartlingii 
 Jungermannia bastovii 
 Jungermannia baueri 
 Jungermannia baueriana 
 Jungermannia bengalensis 
 Jungermannia bergiana 
 Jungermannia bicuspidata 
 Jungermannia bidentata 
 Jungermannia biformis 
 Jungermannia birostrata 
 Jungermannia borealis 
 Jungermannia borgenii 
 Jungermannia brasiliensis 
 Jungermannia brevicaulis 
 Jungermannia breviperianthia 
 Jungermannia brunnea 
 Jungermannia byssacea 
 Jungermannia caelestis 
 Jungermannia caespiticia 
 Jungermannia calcarata 
 Jungermannia calcarea 
 Jungermannia callithrix 
 Jungermannia calocysta 
 Jungermannia caoii 
 Jungermannia capilligera 
 Jungermannia caucasica 
 Jungermannia cephalozioides 
 Jungermannia ceylanica 
 Jungermannia cheniana 
 Jungermannia chiloscyphoides 
 Jungermannia chinensis 
 Jungermannia ciliaris 
 Jungermannia circinalis 
 Jungermannia clavellata 
 Jungermannia claviflora 
 Jungermannia clavigera 
 Jungermannia cognata 
 Jungermannia colpodes 
 Jungermannia comata 
 Jungermannia commutata 
 Jungermannia complanata 
 Jungermannia comptonii 
 Jungermannia conchifolia 
 Jungermannia conferta 
 Jungermannia confertissima 
 Jungermannia conjugata 
 Jungermannia conradii 
 Jungermannia convexa 
 Jungermannia cordifolia 
 Jungermannia crassa 
 Jungermannia crenulata 
 Jungermannia crenuliformis 
 Jungermannia crispa 
 Jungermannia crispata 
 Jungermannia cyclops 
 Jungermannia cylindracea 
 Jungermannia cylindrica 
 Jungermannia cymbifolia 
 Jungermannia cyparioides 
 Jungermannia decolor 
 Jungermannia decolyana 
 Jungermannia decurrens 
 Jungermannia densifolia 
 Jungermannia diademata 
 Jungermannia dicksonii 
 Jungermannia dilitata 
 Jungermannia discoidea 
 Jungermannia distinctifolia 
 Jungermannia divaricata 
 Jungermannia diversiclavellata 
 Jungermannia doelaviensis 
 Jungermannia dubia 
 Jungermannia dubioides 
 Jungermannia ecklonii 
 Jungermannia elongata 
 Jungermannia epiphlaea 
 Jungermannia epiphylla 
 Jungermannia erecta 
 Jungermannia erectifolia 
 Jungermannia erectii 
 Jungermannia ericetorum 
 Jungermannia eriocaula 
 Jungermannia eucordifolia 
 Jungermannia evansii 
 Jungermannia exsertifolia 
 Jungermannia extensa 
 Jungermannia falcata 
 Jungermannia fauriana 
 Jungermannia flaccidula 
 Jungermannia flagellalioides 
 Jungermannia flagellaris 
 Jungermannia flagellata 
 Jungermannia flagellifera 
 Jungermannia formosa 
 Jungermannia fossombronioides 
 Jungermannia frullanioides 
 Jungermannia furcata 
 Jungermannia fusiformis 
 Jungermannia glaucum 
 Jungermannia gongshanensis 
 Jungermannia gracillima 
 Jungermannia granulata 
 Jungermannia grollei 
 Jungermannia haliotiphylla 
 Jungermannia handelii 
 Jungermannia hasskarliana 
 Jungermannia hattoriana 
 Jungermannia hattorii 
 Jungermannia hawaiica 
 Jungermannia heteracria 
 Jungermannia heterodonta 
 Jungermannia heterolimbata 
 Jungermannia hexagona 
 Jungermannia hiugaensis 
 Jungermannia hokkaidensis 
 Jungermannia holorhiza 
 Jungermannia hookeri 
 Jungermannia horizontalis 
 Jungermannia hyalina 
 Jungermannia hymenophyllum 
 Jungermannia immersa 
 Jungermannia incerta 
 Jungermannia incurvicolla 
 Jungermannia indica 
 Jungermannia indrodayana 
 Jungermannia infusca 
 Jungermannia inouensis 
 Jungermannia jamesonii 
 Jungermannia japonica 
 Jungermannia javanica 
 Jungermannia jenseniana 
 Jungermannia julacea 
 Jungermannia junghuhniana 
 Jungermannia juratzkana 
 Jungermannia karl-muelleri 
 Jungermannia kashyapii 
 Jungermannia kinabalensis 
 Jungermannia konstantinovae 
 Jungermannia koreana 
 Jungermannia kuwaharae 
 Jungermannia kyushuensis 
 Jungermannia lamellata 
 Jungermannia lanata 
 Jungermannia lanceolata 
 Jungermannia lanigera 
 Jungermannia laxiphylla 
 Jungermannia leiantha 
 Jungermannia lignicola 
 Jungermannia limbata 
 Jungermannia linguifolia 
 Jungermannia lixingjiangiae 
 Jungermannia lobulata 
 Jungermannia longifolia 
 Jungermannia louae 
 Jungermannia lycopodioides 
 Jungermannia lyonii 
 Jungermannia mackaii 
 Jungermannia macrocarpa 
 Jungermannia macrorhiza 
 Jungermannia magna 
 Jungermannia mairangii 
 Jungermannia mamatkulovii 
 Jungermannia marsilea 
 Jungermannia martiana 
 Jungermannia mauii 
 Jungermannia menzelii 
 Jungermannia menziesii 
 Jungermannia michelii 
 Jungermannia microphylla 
 Jungermannia microrevoluta 
 Jungermannia miehena 
 Jungermannia mildeana 
 Jungermannia minutissima 
 Jungermannia minutiverrucosa 
 Jungermannia mizutanii 
 Jungermannia mollissima 
 Jungermannia mollusca 
 Jungermannia monticola 
 Jungermannia multicarpa 
 Jungermannia multifida 
 Jungermannia murmanica 
 Jungermannia musae 
 Jungermannia myosota 
 Jungermannia nana 
 Jungermannia nigrescens 
 Jungermannia nigricaulis 
 Jungermannia nilgiriensis 
 Jungermannia nimbosa 
 Jungermannia nipponica 
 Jungermannia nivalis 
 Jungermannia nobilis 
 Jungermannia obcordata 
 Jungermannia obliquata 
 Jungermannia oblonga 
 Jungermannia oblongifolia 
 Jungermannia obovata 
 Jungermannia obtusiflora 
 Jungermannia ochroleuca 
 Jungermannia odorata 
 Jungermannia ohbae 
 Jungermannia onraedtii 
 Jungermannia opacula 
 Jungermannia orizabensis 
 Jungermannia otiana 
 Jungermannia ovato-trigona 
 Jungermannia pachyrhiza 
 Jungermannia paroica (Schiffner) 
 Jungermannia parviperiantha 
 Jungermannia parvitexta 
 Jungermannia parvula 
 Jungermannia paucifolia 
 Jungermannia paupercula 
 Jungermannia pellucida 
 Jungermannia pendulina 
 Jungermannia perloi 
 Jungermannia pinguis 
 Jungermannia pinnatifolia 
 Jungermannia placophylla 
 Jungermannia plagiochilacea 
 Jungermannia plagiochiloides 
 Jungermannia planifolia 
 Jungermannia platyphylla 
 Jungermannia plicata 
 Jungermannia plicatiscypha 
 Jungermannia plicatula 
 Jungermannia pluridentata 
 Jungermannia pocsii 
 Jungermannia polaris 
 Jungermannia polyanthos 
 Jungermannia polyclada 
 Jungermannia polymorpha 
 Jungermannia polyphylla 
 Jungermannia polyrhiza 
 Jungermannia porella 
 Jungermannia portoricensis 
 Jungermannia potamophila 
 Jungermannia preissiana 
 Jungermannia primordialis 
 Jungermannia procumbens 
 Jungermannia pseudocyclops 
 Jungermannia pseudodecolyana 
 Jungermannia ptychantha 
 Jungermannia pulchella 
 Jungermannia pulvinata 
 Jungermannia pumila 
 Jungermannia pungens 
 Jungermannia purpurata 
 Jungermannia purpurea 
 Jungermannia pusilla 
 Jungermannia pycnantha 
 Jungermannia pygmaea 
 Jungermannia pyriflora 
 Jungermannia quadridens 
 Jungermannia quadridentata 
 Jungermannia quadridigitata 
 Jungermannia quadrifida 
 Jungermannia quadripartita 
 Jungermannia raddiana 
 Jungermannia radiata 
 Jungermannia radicans 
 Jungermannia radicellosa 
 Jungermannia ramosissima 
 Jungermannia rauana 
 Jungermannia raujeana 
 Jungermannia reclinans 
 Jungermannia recondita 
 Jungermannia renauldii 
 Jungermannia reniformia 
 Jungermannia repanda 
 Jungermannia repens 
 Jungermannia repleta 
 Jungermannia reptans 
 Jungermannia resupinata 
 Jungermannia retrospectans 
 Jungermannia retusata 
 Jungermannia revolvens 
 Jungermannia rhizophora 
 Jungermannia riparia 
 Jungermannia rishiriensis 
 Jungermannia rivalis 
 Jungermannia rivularis 
 Jungermannia rosacea 
 Jungermannia rostellata 
 Jungermannia rosulans 
 Jungermannia rotaeana 
 Jungermannia rothii 
 Jungermannia rotundata 
 Jungermannia rotundifolia 
 Jungermannia rubiginosa 
 Jungermannia rubra  
 Jungermannia rubripunctata 
 Jungermannia rupicola 
 Jungermannia rupincola 
 Jungermannia saccata 
 Jungermannia saccaticoncava 
 Jungermannia saccatula 
 Jungermannia sanguinolenta 
 Jungermannia sarmentosa 
 Jungermannia sauteri 
 Jungermannia scalariformis 
 Jungermannia scandens 
 Jungermannia schauliana 
 Jungermannia schiffneri 
 Jungermannia schistophila 
 Jungermannia schizopleura 
 Jungermannia schraderi 
 Jungermannia schultzii 
 Jungermannia schusterana 
 Jungermannia scolopendra 
 Jungermannia scorpioides 
 Jungermannia secunda 
 Jungermannia secundifolia 
 Jungermannia sehlmeyeri 
 Jungermannia serpens 
 Jungermannia serpentina 
 Jungermannia serpillifolia 
 Jungermannia serrata 
 Jungermannia sessilis 
 Jungermannia sexplicata 
 Jungermannia shimizuana 
 Jungermannia sikkimensis 
 Jungermannia sordida 
 Jungermannia sparsofolia 
 Jungermannia sphaerocarpa 
 Jungermannia sphagnoides 
 Jungermannia squarrosa 
 Jungermannia squarrosula 
 Jungermannia stephanii 
 Jungermannia subapicaulis 
 Jungermannia subelliptica 
 Jungermannia subinflata 
 Jungermannia submersa 
 Jungermannia subrubra 
 Jungermannia subulata 
 Jungermannia superba 
 Jungermannia tabularis 
 Jungermannia tamarisci 
 Jungermannia taxifolia 
 Jungermannia tetragona 
 Jungermannia thymifolia 
 Jungermannia torticalyx 
 Jungermannia totopapillosa 
 Jungermannia towadaensis 
 Jungermannia trichophylla 
 Jungermannia trilobata 
 Jungermannia truncata 
 Jungermannia tsukushiensis 
 Jungermannia tuberculata 
 Jungermannia udarii 
 Jungermannia ulothrix 
 Jungermannia ulvoides 
 Jungermannia uncialis 
 Jungermannia uncifolia 
 Jungermannia undulata 
 Jungermannia unispiris 
 Jungermannia ustulata 
 Jungermannia vaginata 
 Jungermannia varia 
 Jungermannia ventroversa 
 Jungermannia vernicosa 
 Jungermannia verrucosa 
 Jungermannia victoriensis 
 Jungermannia virgata 
 Jungermannia viridis 
 Jungermannia viridula 
 Jungermannia viticulosa 
 Jungermannia volkensii 
 Jungermannia vulcanicola 
 Jungermannia wagneri 
 Jungermannia wattiana 
 Jungermannia weddelliana 
 Jungermannia yangii 
 Jungermannia zangmuii 
 Jungermannia zantenii 
 Jungermannia zengii 
 Jungermannia zeyheri

References

Jungermanniales
Jungermanniales genera